T.J. Kemp (born July 3, 1981) is a Canadian former professional ice hockey defenceman.

Playing career
Kemp played hockey at Mercyhurst College from 2001–2005. After graduating he played for the Missouri River Otters of the UHL. He then played for the Reading Royals of the ECHL before playing for a large numbers of teams in the AHL including the Peoria Rivermen, Iowa Stars, Milwaukee Admirals, Bridgeport Sound Tigers, Manchester Monarchs, and Springfield Falcons.

On July 8, 2008, Kemp signed a one-year contract with the Pittsburgh Penguins. After 22 games with AHL affiliate, Wilkes-Barre/Scranton Penguins, Kemp was traded by Pittsburgh to the Montreal for a conditional draft pick on January 5, 2009. He was then assigned to the Hamilton Bulldogs of the AHL.

On July 14, 2010, Kemp was not offered a new contract with Augsburger Panther and was signed by fellow DEL team, Thomas Sabo Ice Tigers for the 2010–11 season.

After a season in the Italian Serie A with Ritten-Renon, Kemp signed a one-year contract abroad with Oji Eagles of the Asian League Ice Hockey on August 9, 2013.

Career statistics

Awards and honours

References

External links 
 

1981 births
Living people
Augsburger Panther players
Bridgeport Sound Tigers players
Canadian ice hockey defencemen
Hamilton Bulldogs (AHL) players
Iowa Stars players
Manchester Monarchs (AHL) players
Mercyhurst Lakers men's ice hockey players
Milwaukee Admirals players
Missouri River Otters players
Nürnberg Ice Tigers players
Oji Eagles players
People from Pickering, Ontario
Peoria Rivermen (AHL) players
Reading Royals players
Ritten Sport players
Springfield Falcons players
Wilkes-Barre/Scranton Penguins players
Canadian expatriate ice hockey players in Germany